Keith Thomas may refer to:

Keith Thomas (footballer, born 1961) (born 1961), Australian rules footballer
Keith Thomas (footballer, born 1929) (1929–2017), Australian rules footballer
Keith Thomas (English footballer) (1929–2021), English footballer
Keith Thomas (historian) (born 1933), Welsh historian
Keith Thomas (record producer), US record producer and songwriter
Keith Thomas (saxophonist), British saxophonist, writer and producer
Keith Thomas (sailor) (born 1956), sailor who competed for the British Virgin Islands
Keith Thomas (director), wrote and directed the 2019 film The Vigil